Paul James McMullan (born 25 February 1996) is a Scottish professional footballer who plays as a winger for Dundee. McMullan started his career with Celtic and has also had loan spells at Greenock Morton, Stenhousemuir, St Mirren and Dunfermline Athletic.

Career

Celtic
Born in Stirling, McMullan began his career in the under-19 team at Celtic.

Stenhousemuir (loan)
On 23 January 2015, he joined Scottish League One club Stenhousemuir on loan for the remainder of the season. He made his senior debut the following day, playing the full 90 minutes of a 1–1 draw with Ayr United at Ochilview Park, scoring his team's goal. On 14 February, he opened the scoring away to Dunfermline Athletic, who came from behind to defeat Stenhousemuir 3–2. McMullan's only other goal of 14 league appearances came on 11 April in a defeat by the same score at Greenock Morton. Stenhousemuir finished in the relegation play-off places, but stayed up with a 2–1 aggregate victory over Queen's Park: McMullan's free-kick set up Jamie McCormack to head the only goal of the first leg on 13 May, and he also assisted Colin McMenamin in the second leg three days later.

St Mirren (loan)
On 13 July 2015, McMullan was loaned to Scottish Championship club St Mirren for the 2015–16 season. He made his debut 12 days later, playing the full 90 minutes of a 3–1 home win over Berwick Rangers in the first round of the Scottish Challenge Cup. On 7 August, he made his league debut for the team in a defeat by the same score to Rangers at Ibrox. Twenty-two days later, he scored his only goal for the team from Paisley, taking four minutes to open a 1–1 draw against Livingston at St. Mirren Park; the result meant his team had not won yet in four league games of the season.

In January 2016, McMullan's loan was ended by Saints, and he returned to Celtic. In total, he played 22 games for the club, scoring once.

Greenock Morton (loan)
McMullan was loaned to Greenock Morton on 24 February 2016, making his debut in a 3–0 Championship win at Hibernian on the same day. On 15 March at Cappielow, he scored his first goal for the Ton, putting them 3–0 up at half time in an eventual 3–2 win over Queen of the South.

Dunfermline Athletic (loan)
On 4 July 2016, McMullan was loaned to newly promoted Championship team Dunfermline Athletic, as PJ Crossan made the move in the other direction on a permanent basis.

Dundee United
On 23 June 2017, McMullan signed a two-year contract with Dundee United.

Dundee 
On 7 January 2021, McMullan signed a pre-contract with United's crosstown rivals Dundee, which would see him begin a two-year deal at the end of the season. On 26 January, McMullan joined Dundee on loan until the end of the season. Despite only joining in January, McMullan would sit atop the league assist charts by the end of the season, and would play a key role in helping the club win the Premiership play-offs and gaining promotion back to the Scottish Premiership. At the end of the season, McMullan was named in the SPFL's Championship Team of the Season.

McMullan officially joined Dundee on his two-year deal in June 2021. He would score his first competitive goals for the club in the Scottish League Cup, netting a brace against Brora Rangers. On 5 March 2022, McMullan would finally score his first league goal for the club since he joined over a year prior in a draw away to Motherwell.

After returning to the Scottish Championship the following season, McMullan would have a very strong start in both goals and assists, and would be named the Championship Player of the Month in November 2022.

International
McMullan represented Scotland at the under-16, under-17, under-19 and under-21 levels. He made his debut for the under-21 team in March 2017, appearing in a goalless draw against Estonia.

Career statistics

Honours

Club 
Dundee United

 Scottish Championship: 2019–20

Individual 
Dundee

 SPFL Championship Team of the Season: 2020–21
 Scottish Championship Player of the Month: November 2022

References

External links

1996 births
Living people
Footballers from Stirling
Scottish footballers
Scotland youth international footballers
Scotland under-21 international footballers
Association football forwards
Celtic F.C. players
Stenhousemuir F.C. players
St Mirren F.C. players
Greenock Morton F.C. players
Dunfermline Athletic F.C. players
Dundee United F.C. players
Dundee F.C. players
Scottish Professional Football League players